Bilsdorf is a village in the commune of Rambrouch, in western Luxembourg.  , the village had a population of 114. Olympian Nico Klein was born here.

References

Rambrouch
Villages in Luxembourg